An inverted river delta is special category of river delta in which the narrow end of the delta emerges on the seafront and the wide end is located further inland, so that with respect to the seafront, the locations of both ends of the delta are inverted.

Explanation 

River deltas typically form on flat, coastal floodplains: the narrow end located at the point where a river fans out and deposits sediment in a region extending outward into the body of water which the river empties. In the case of an inverted delta, the delta is located at the waterway's exit from a large, flat valley, yet still inside the valley. The sediment is dropped within the valley and the clear water then exits into a bay or the ocean, so the apex of the delta is at this exit, a configuration said to be inverted from that usually seen. Inverted deltas typically do not last long in geological terms, since they tend to fill up with sediments rather quickly and eventually become normal deltas.

Examples

The Sacramento-San Joaquin River Delta
A classic example of an inverted river delta is the Sacramento-San Joaquin River Delta, which lies at the confluence of the Sacramento and San Joaquin rivers in California.  The water from the rivers that drain the entire, large California Central Valley exit through the Carquinez Strait, a narrow gap in the Coast Range.  An inverted river delta exists behind this strait.

The Tagus River
Another example is the delta of the Tagus river in Portugal, although due to sedimentation this delta is now only very partially inverted, with the valley now mostly filled with sediment. It is still about 15 km wide and 25 km long, compared with the 2 km wide exit into the sea, and forms a large lagoon with large and very shallow sand banks which go uncovered during low tides. The delta used to be even bigger thousands of years ago.

Landforms
 Inverted river delta